Clacton-on-Sea railway station is one of the two eastern termini of the Sunshine Coast Line, a branch of the Great Eastern Main Line, in the East of England, serving the town of Clacton-on-Sea, Essex. It is  down the line from London Liverpool Street. Its three-letter station code is CLT.

The station was opened in 1882 with the name Clacton. It is currently managed by Greater Anglia, which also operates all trains serving the station.

The branch diverges from the Great Eastern Main Line at  whence trains run to either ,  or Clacton-on-Sea. Clacton is on a spur from Thorpe-le-Soken which was built by the Clacton-on-Sea Railway and originally operated by the Great Eastern Railway. It opened some 15 years after the branch to Walton was opened.

On 1 January 1923 the station passed to the London and North Eastern Railway following the 1921 Railways Act. After World War II and following nationalisation, it fell under the auspices of British Railways (Eastern Region).

Services were steam-operated until the line was electrified, with Clacton first seeing electric trains on 16 March 1959. Initially, the line was only electrified as far as Colchester, as part of British Railways' experiments with 25 kV AC electrification, rather than the previously preferred 1500 V DC system. Through electrified services to Liverpool Street were introduced on 7 January 1963.

Clacton station has a sizeable concourse sheltered by a glazed roof. Platforms 1 and 3 have an operational length for ten-coach trains and platforms 2 and 4 have an operational length for twelve-coach trains. There is a traction depot just outside the station, with some stabling sidings alongside the station itself.

Its name was changed to Clacton-on-Sea in May 2007.

Services

During peak hours the service level is increased to approximately four trains per hour. The first and last trains of the day start and terminate at Colchester.

Trains are usually formed of  electric multiple units.

References

External links

Railway Station
Railway stations in Essex
Former Great Eastern Railway stations
Greater Anglia franchise railway stations
Railway stations in Great Britain opened in 1882
DfT Category C1 stations